Rebrovo Point (‘Nos Rebrovo’ \'nos re-'bro-vo\) is a point on Aktinia Beach on the southwest coast of Snow Island in the South Shetland Islands, Antarctica projecting 200 m into Boyd Strait. It is situated 2.8 km southeast of Monroe Point and 2.8 km northwest of Cape Conway, and is snow-free in summer.

The point is named after the settlement of Rebrovo in western Bulgaria.

Location
Bulgarian mapping in 2009.

Map
 L.L. Ivanov. Antarctica: Livingston Island and Greenwich, Robert, Snow and Smith Islands. Scale 1:120000 topographic map.  Troyan: Manfred Wörner Foundation, 2009.

References
 Rebrovo Point. SCAR Composite Gazetteer of Antarctica.
 Bulgarian Antarctic Gazetteer. Antarctic Place-names Commission. (details in Bulgarian, basic data in English)

External links
 Rebrovo Point. Copernix satellite image

Headlands of the South Shetland Islands
Bulgaria and the Antarctic